Gurghiu is a commune in Mureș County, Transylvania, Romania. It is composed of ten villages: Adrian (Görgényadorján), Cașva (Kásva), Comori (Kincsesfő), Fundoaia (Kásvavölgy), Glăjărie (Görgényüvegcsűr), Gurghiu, Larga (Lárgatelep), Orșova (Görgényorsova), Orșova-Pădure (Szécs) and Păuloaia (Pálpatak).

See also
List of Hungarian exonyms (Mureș County)

References

Communes in Mureș County
Localities in Transylvania